Shafrir may refer to:

Persons
Doree Shafrir, American author and  BuzzFeed editor
Dov Shafrir, Israeli Custodian of Absentees' Property

Others
Shafrir, Israel, later Kfar Chabad
Shafrir synagogue shooting attack, 1956
Israeli missile series also known as Python